Aleksei Sergeyevich Khrapov (born 1 March 1979) is a former Russian professional football player.

Club career
He played in the Russian Football National League for FC Vityaz Podolsk in 2008.

Honours
 Russian Second Division Zone Center best defender: 2005.

References

External links
 

1979 births
Footballers from Moscow
Living people
Russian footballers
Association football defenders
FC Vityaz Podolsk players
PFC CSKA Moscow players
FC Saturn Ramenskoye players
FC Petrotrest players